The frequency of exceedance, sometimes called the annual rate of exceedance, is the frequency with which a random process exceeds some critical value.  Typically, the critical value is far from the mean. It is usually defined in terms of the number of peaks of the random process that are outside the boundary. It has applications related to predicting extreme events, such as major earthquakes and floods.

Definition

The frequency of exceedance is the number of times a stochastic process exceeds some critical value, usually a critical value far from the process' mean, per unit time. Counting exceedance of the critical value can be accomplished either by counting peaks of the process that exceed the critical value or by counting upcrossings of the critical value, where an upcrossing is an event where the instantaneous value of the process crosses the critical value with positive slope. This article assumes the two methods of counting exceedance are equivalent and that the process has one upcrossing and one peak per exceedance. However, processes, especially continuous processes with high frequency components to their power spectral densities, may have multiple upcrossings or multiple peaks in rapid succession before the process reverts to its mean.

Frequency of exceedance for a Gaussian process

Consider a scalar, zero-mean Gaussian process  with variance  and power spectral density , where  is a frequency. Over time, this Gaussian process has peaks that exceed some critical value .

 is the frequency of upcrossings of 0 and is related to the power spectral density as

Hoblit gives methods for approximating  in such cases with applications aimed at continuous gusts.

Time and probability of exceedance

As the random process evolves over time, the number of peaks that exceeded the critical value  grows and is itself a counting process. For many types of distributions of the underlying random process, including Gaussian processes, the number of peaks above the critical value  converges to a Poisson process as the critical value becomes arbitrarily large. The interarrival times of this Poisson process are exponentially distributed with rate of decay equal to the frequency of exceedance . Thus, the mean time between peaks, including the residence time or mean time before the very first peak, is the inverse of the frequency of exceedance .

Its complement,

is the probability of exceedance, the probability that  has been exceeded at least once by time . This probability can be useful to estimate whether an extreme event will occur during a specified time period, such as the lifespan of a structure or the duration of an operation.

If  is small, for example for the frequency of a rare event occurring in a short time period, then

Under this assumption, the frequency of exceedance is equal to the probability of exceedance per unit time, and the probability of exceedance can be computed by simply multiplying the frequency of exceedance by the specified length of time.

Applications
 Probability of major earthquakes
 Weather forecasting
 Hydrology and loads on hydraulic structures
 Gust loads on aircraft

See also
 100-year flood
 Cumulative frequency analysis
 Extreme value theory
 Rice's formula

Notes

References
 
 
 
 
 

Extreme value data
Reliability analysis
Stochastic processes
Survival analysis